Felix Earl Browder (July 31, 1927 – December 10, 2016) was an American mathematician known for his work in nonlinear functional analysis. He received the National Medal of Science in 1999 and was President of the American Mathematical Society until 2000. His two younger brothers also became notable mathematicians, William Browder (an algebraic topologist) and Andrew Browder (a specialist in function algebras).

Early life and education

Felix Earl Browder was born in 1927 in Moscow, Russia, while his American father Earl Browder, born in Wichita, Kansas, was living and working there. He had gone to the Soviet Union in 1927. His mother was Raissa Berkmann, a Russian Jewish woman from St. Petersburg whom Browder met and married while living in the Soviet Union. As a child, Felix Browder moved with his family to the United States, where his father Earl Browder for a time was head of the American Communist Party. The father ran for US president in 1936 and 1940. A 1999 book by Alexander Vassiliev, published after the fall of the Soviet Union, said that Earl Browder was recruited in the 1940s as a spy for the Soviet Union.

Felix Browder was a child prodigy in mathematics; he entered MIT at age 16 in 1944 and graduated in 1946 with his first degree in mathematics. In 1946, at MIT he achieved the rank of a Putnam Fellow in the William Lowell Putnam Mathematical Competition. In 1948 (at age 20), he received his doctorate from Princeton University.

Career
Browder had an academic career, encountering difficulty in the 1950s in getting work during the McCarthy era because of his father's communist activities. 

Browder headed the University of Chicago's mathematics department for 12 years. He also held posts at MIT, Boston University, Brandeis and Yale. In 1986 he became the first vice president for research at Rutgers University.

Browder received the 1999 National Medal of Science. He also served as president of the American Mathematical Society from 1999 to 2000.

In his outgoing presidential address at the American Mathematical Society, Browder noted, "ideas and techniques from one set of mathematical sources imping[ing] fruitfully on the same thing from another set of mathematical sources" as illustration of bisociation (a term from Arthur Koestler). He also recounted the moves against mathematics in France by Claude Allègre as problematic.

Browder was known for his personal library, which contained some thirty-five thousand books. "The library has a number of different categories," he said. "There is mathematics, physics and science as well as philosophy, literature and history, with a certain number of volumes of contemporary political science and economics. It is a polymath library. I am interested in everything and my library reflects all my interests."

Family

Browder married Eva Tislowitz in 1949, born to Jewish parents. Their children included Dr. Thomas Browder, a physicist specializing in the experimental study of subatomic particles, and Bill Browder, who became CEO of Hermitage Capital Management and resides in London.

The late Dr. Browder had two younger brothers who were also research mathematicians, William (an algebraic topologist) and Andrew Browder (a specialist in function algebras). Browder died in 2016 at home in Princeton, New Jersey, aged 89. "In addition to his brothers, survivors include the above mentioned two sons, Thomas Browder of Honolulu and Bill Browder of London; and five grandchildren."

See also

 Earl Browder, father
 William Browder (mathematician), brother
 Andrew Browder, brother
 Bill Browder, son
 Joshua Browder grandson

References

External links
Rutger's announcement
AMS Presidents: A Timeline

1927 births
2016 deaths
20th-century American mathematicians
21st-century American mathematicians
American people of Russian-Jewish descent
Princeton University alumni
Rutgers University faculty
National Medal of Science laureates
Presidents of the American Mathematical Society
Members of the United States National Academy of Sciences
Functional analysts
Felix
Massachusetts Institute of Technology School of Science faculty
Putnam Fellows